Rudra is a genus of jumping spiders that was first described by George and Elizabeth Peckham in 1885. The name refers to Rudra, a Rigvedic god.

Species
 it contains ten species, found in Central America, Brazil, Guyana, Argentina, and French Guiana:
Rudra brescoviti Braul & Lise, 1999 – Brazil
Rudra dagostinae Braul & Lise, 1999 – Brazil
Rudra geniculata Peckham & Peckham, 1885 (type) – Guatemala, Panama
Rudra humilis Mello-Leitão, 1945 – Argentina, Brazil
Rudra minensis Galiano, 1984 – Brazil
Rudra multispina Caporiacco, 1947 – Guyana
Rudra oriximina Galiano, 1984 – Brazil
Rudra polita Peckham & Peckham, 1894 – Guatemala
Rudra tenera Peckham & Peckham, 1894 – Brazil
Rudra wagae (Taczanowski, 1871) – French Guiana

References

External links
 Photographs of Rudra species from Brazil

Salticidae genera
Salticidae
Spiders of Central America
Spiders of South America